Blood Red Rivers is a crime novel by Jean-Christophe Grangé, set in the French Alps. First published in French in 1997, it appeared in September 1999 in an English translation by Ian Monk.

Plot summary

Development

Reception

Adaptations
In 2000, Blood Red Rivers was adapted into film as The Crimson Rivers, starring Jean Reno and Vincent Cassel. The Crimson Rivers, a tv series following the novel and its adaption first aired in 2018, starring Olivier Marchal and Erika Sainte.

References

1997 French novels
French crime novels
Novels set in France
French novels adapted into films
French novels adapted into television shows